Podyelnoye is a rural locality (a village) in Kadnikov, Sokolsky District, Vologda Oblast, Russia. The population was 16 as of 2002.

Geography 
Podyelnoye is located 27 km northeast of Sokol (the district's administrative centre) by road. Yerdenovo is the nearest rural locality.

References 

Rural localities in Sokolsky District, Vologda Oblast